Adjoua Flore Kouamé (born 1964, in Abidjan) is a novelist from Côte d'Ivoire.

Life
Adjoua Flore Kouamé graduated with a master's degree in law from the National School of Administration of the Côte d'Ivoire. In the 1990s she became a civil administrator and deputy director at the Ministry of the Interior. In 2008 she held the position of Head of the Prime Minister's Office.

Works
 La valse des tourments [The Merry-Go-Round of Torments], Abidjan: NEI, 1998.

References

1964 births
Living people
Ivorian women novelists
Ivorian women writers
Ivorian writers in French
People from Abidjan